Bolgar is the name of several inhabited localities in the Republic of Tatarstan, Russia.

Urban localities
Bolgar, Spassky District, Republic of Tatarstan, a town in Spassky District, 

Rural localities
Bolgar, Nizhnekamsky District, Republic of Tatarstan, a selo in Nizhnekamsky District,